The 2016 Big Sky Conference women's soccer tournament is the postseason women's soccer tournament for the Big Sky Conference to be held from November 2 to 6, 2016. The five match tournament will be held at campus sites, with the higher seed hosting. The six team single-elimination tournament will consist of three rounds based on seeding from regular season conference play. The Northern Colorado Bears are the defending tournament champions, after defeating the Idaho Vandals in a penalty kick shootout in the championship match.

Bracket

Schedule

First Round

Semifinals

Final

References 
2016 Big Sky Conference Women's Soccer Championship

Big Sky Conference Women's Soccer Tournament
2016 Big Sky Conference women's soccer season